Binary liquid is a type of chemical combination, which creates a special reaction or feature as a result of mixing two liquid chemicals, that are normally inert or have no function by themselves. A number of chemical products are produced as a result of mixing two chemicals as a binary liquid, such as plastic foams and some explosives.

See also
Binary chemical weapon
Thermophoresis
Percus-Yevick equation

References

External links
Phase separation of a binary liquid mixture in porous media studied by nuclear magnetic resonance cryoporometry
Surface adsorption and orientation near the critical point of binary liquid mixtures
Binary liquid mixtures in porous solids

Chemical substances
Chemical weapons